The Society of Korean Poets Award(hangul : 한국시인협회상) is the oldest prize in Korean literature. 
The Society of Korean Poets reviews the annual collection of poems published and selects winners annually.
The winner was named Kim Soo-young in the first year(1957), and Moon Hyo-chi was chosen by 2017.
Since 2005, the Society of Korean Poets has given additional awards to young poets.

Winners

References

South Korean literary awards
Poetry awards
Awards established in 1957